Ibrahim Electric is a Danish band situated primarily in Copenhagen, Denmark. Ibrahim "Jævnstrøm" Electric are widely famous in Denmark for their experimental music, many genres, including jazz, funk, afro-beat, surf and many more. The band members are Niclas Knudsen (guitar), Stefan Pasborg (drums) and Jeppe Tuxen (Hammond B-3) In 2005 they recorded a live CD with trombonist Ray Anderson at Copenhagen Jazzhouse, called Ibrahim Electric Meets Ray Anderson.  They repeated this in 2007 with the CD Ibrahim Electric Meets Ray Anderson - Again!.

In 2006 they released the album Absinthe: Ian Patterson for All About Jazz found that this record avoided the tendency of groove-based music to sound repetitive. Gaffa gave this album 4/6, calling Ibrahim Electric "one of the most interesting and elusive bands" in Denmark.

Discography 

2004: Ibrahim Electric (ILK Music)
2005: Ibrahim Electric Meets Ray Anderson (Stunt Records)
2006: Absinthe (Stunt Records)
2007: Ibrahim Electric Meets Ray Anderson - Again (Stunt Records)
2008: Brothers of Utopia (Tactic Records)
2010: Royal Air Maroc ' (Tactic Records)
2012: Isle of Men (Target Records)
2014: Rumours from Outer Space (ILK Music)
2017: The Marathon Concert (Stunt Records)
2020: Time Machine (Stunt Records/Sundance Music)

Galleri

References

Danish musical groups
Ilk Records artists